Phoenix Beverages is the largest brewery in Mauritius. Their Phoenix Beer (lager) is widely distributed on the island and is exported to Europe, Australia, Reunion Island, Madagascar, etc. The company also has connections with the Guinness Brewery and is listed on the Stock Exchange of Mauritius. They have three plants in Mauritius, PhoenixBev Brewery Plant, PhoenixBev Carbonated Soft Drinks Plant and PhoenixBev Stills Plant. They also have a plant in Reunion Island known as Edena Boissons.

Corporate history 
 1931 - The company is incorporated as Phoenix Camp Minerals Limited (PCM)
 1953 - Signature of their bottling agreement with Coca-Cola
 1960 - Creation of Mauritius Breweries Ltd (MBL)
 1963 - Inauguration of brewery
 1991 - Creation of the (Mauritius) Glass Gallery Ltd to recycle glass waste
 1993 - MBL is listed on the Stock Exchange of Mauritius
 2003 - Change of name of MBL to Phoenix Beverages Ltd (PBL)
 2008 - Fusion of PBL and PCM
 2014 - PBL acquires the Eski soft-drink company and also begins wine bottling operations
 2015 - Signature of bottling agreement with Schweppes International for Orangina
 2016 - Acquisition of Edena SA (incorporated in Réunion Island)
 2021 - Change of name of Koté Vins & Spirits to PhoenixBev Wines & Spirits
 2021 - Launch of PhoenixEarth Initiative
 2022 - The company starts to take steps to reduce its carbon footprint. Switches to green energy.

Products

Product history 
 1963 - Launch of Phoenix beer 
 1964 - Launch of Stella Pils beer
 1965 - Launch of Sprite soft-drink
 1975 - Launch of Guinness stout
 1976 - Launch of Crystal table water
 1986 - Launch of Diet Coke
 1988 - Launch of Malta Guinness
 1989 - Launch of Blue Marlin beer
 1990 - Launch of Appletiser
 2005 - Launch of Phoenix Special Brew beer
 2008 - Launch of Phoenix Fresh beer 
 2014 - Acquisition of Eski soft-drink brand
 2015 - Launch of GR8 wine
 2016 - Launch of Gister Premium beer
 2017 - Launch of Fuze Tea
 2017 - Launch of 5Alive Pulpy juice
 2020 - Relaunch of Cidona

Phoenix Beer

Phoenix Beer began production in 1963. It has an ABV of 5%, and is described as a "golden lager" by the manufacturers. Their malted spring barley comes from Australia and Europe. It is also available in draught at local resorts and restaurants.

Phoenix also produces two strong lager style beers. One called Blue Marlin; the other Phoenix Special Brew. They brew Guinness Foreign Extra Stout under licence.

Awards

See also
 Beer in Africa

References

External links
 Phoenix Beverages Group website

Companies listed on the Stock Exchange of Mauritius
Drink companies of Mauritius
Breweries of Africa
Food and drink companies established in 1960
1960 establishments in Mauritius
Coca-Cola bottlers